The Victorian Honour Roll of Women was established in 2001 to recognise the achievements of women from the Australian state of Victoria. The Honour Roll was established as part of the celebrations of Victoria's Centenary of Federation.

Public nominations for the Honour Roll open in the second half of each year and the inductees are reviewed by an independent panel of women. A short list of candidates is then sent to the Victorian Government Minister for Women for her consideration and selection.

The Honour Roll celebrates exceptional women in Victoria who have made significant and lasting contributions to their communities, the nation or the world. Women are recognised for their achievements in a broad range of fields, including science, arts, environment, law, social justice, family violence prevention, research, health, media and education.

, more than 600 women have been inducted onto the Honour Roll. The Office of Women's Policy produces commemorative booklets that contain biographical sketches of each woman inducted onto the Honour Roll.

Inductees

See also

 List of awards honoring women

References

External links
Victorian Women's Honour Roll

Lists of Australian women
Orders, decorations, and medals for women
Awards established in 2001
Culture in Victoria (Australia)
Feminism and history
Halls of fame in Australia
Lists of Australian people
Victoria (Australia)-related lists
Women's halls of fame